Simon Lenski is a cello player from Antwerp, Belgium. His main activity lies within the band DAAU which he co-founded in 1992.

As a cello player, he is a highly sought guest musician for other artists and music groups, often together with his brother Buni Lenski. In 2004 he set up a collaboration with Swiss avant-garde cello player Bo Wiget. Together they released an album Die Vögelein schweigen im Walde.

In 2008 Simon Lenski composed the soundtrack for the movie Left Bank Linkeroever.

Simon Lenski composed the music for several theater plays.

In 2011 Simon Lenski composed and recorded the soundtrack for the short movie Motor of Dutch movie maker Simone Bennett. For this musical piece a special electric twelve string violin was built for him by experimental luthier Yuri Landman.

Since 2017 Simon Lenski is a member of the Needcompany ensemble.

2018-19 he toured Europe with Selah Sue as member of an acoustic trio formation (Guitar / vocal, key's & cello).

In 2019 he created, in collaboration with George van Dam a dance performance based on the Goldberg Variations in which George van Dam played the entire Variations and Simon Lenski danced to them. The piece premièred at the December Dance festival in Bruges on december 6th 2019.

Discography 
For Simon Lenski's discography with DAAU, please see DAAU.
 Simon Lenski / Bo Wiget - Die Vögelein schweigen im Walde (2007)
 Laïs Lenski - Laïs Lenski (2009), together with Laïs
 Simon Lenski: Oh City (solo EP 2016) Simon Lenski

Collaborations 
Kiss My Jazz
Bettie Serveert
Ez3Kiel
Think of One
Flowers for Breakfast
Mintzkov Luna
Donkey Diesel
Mauro - Songs from a Bad Hat
Gitbox
Zita Swoon
Maxon Blewitt
Cinérex
An Pierlé
Millionaire
Soul Sucker
I Hate Camera
Paramount Styles
Ellen Schoenaerts Kwartet
Magnus
Gorki / Luk De Vos
Needcompany
Selah Sue

Film and theatre scores
 / Venlo, Theatre Score
 / The Haunted House of History, Theatre Score and performer
 / Meg Stuart : Revisited, performer
Eisbär / Collateral Damage, Theatre Score
Andcompany & Co / Der (kommende) Aufstand, performer
Andcompany & Co / Orpheus in der Oberwelt, Theatre Score / performer
"Theater Froefroe / Macbeth, Theatre Score and performer
Left Bank Linkeroever, soundtrack
Waste Land, soundtrack
Needcompany /  O, Or The Challenge of This Particular Show Was To Have Words Ending in O, Performer / Theatre Score
Benny Claessens & CAMPO/ Hello Useless, for W and friends, Theatre Score
 / The Future of Sex , Theatre Score / Performer

Needcompany 

 O, Or The Challenge Of This Show Was To Have Words Ending In O
 War And Turpentine
 All The Good
 The House Of Our Fathers / Mothers Of Invention
 Probabilities Of Independent Events

References

External links
 Simon Lenski

Year of birth missing (living people)
Living people
Belgian musicians
People from Antwerp
21st-century Belgian musicians
20th-century Belgian musicians